Gerda Bredgaard (14 May 1908 – 8 June 1996) was a Danish swimmer. She competed in two events at the 1928 Summer Olympics.

References

External links
 

1908 births
1996 deaths
Danish female freestyle swimmers
Olympic swimmers of Denmark
Swimmers at the 1928 Summer Olympics
Swimmers from Copenhagen